The 2003 RTHK Top 10 Gold Songs Awards was held in 2003 for the 2002 music season.

Top 10 song awards
The top 10 songs (十大中文金曲) of 2003 are as follows.

Other awards

References
 RTHK top 10 gold song awards 2003

RTHK Top 10 Gold Songs Awards
Rthk Top 10 Gold Songs Awards, 2003
Rthk Top 10 Gold Songs Awards, 2003